Locks is the sixth studio album by Japanese band  Garnet Crow.It was released on March 18, 2008 under Giza Studio label.

Background
The album includes three previously released singles, Kaze to Rainbow/Kono Te wo Nobaseba, Namida no Yesterday and Sekai wa Mawaru to Iu Keredo. Two were remixed under the title album ver., with instrumentation 30 seconds longer and more varied in comparison to the original singles.

Locks is the group's first album which was released in three formats: regular edition, limited "A" and "B" CD+DVD edition. Limited "A" includes DVD disc with the short footage of their live Garnet Crow Special Live in Ninnanji and limited "B" includes DVD disc with three music videoclips.

Commercial performance 
"Locks" made its chart debut on the official Oricon Albums Chart at #5 rank for first week with 31,555 sold copies. It charted for 6 weeks and sold more than 45,000 copies.

Track listing 
All tracks are composed by Yuri Nakamura, written by Nana Azuki and arranged by Hirohito Furui.

Usage in media 
Namida no Yesterday was used as opening theme for Anime television series Detective Conan
Sekai wa Mawaru to Iu Keredo was used as ending theme for anime Detective Conan
Mou Ichido Waratte was used as ending theme for TBS program Deji@Kan
Kaze to Rainbow was used as opening theme for Anime television series MÄR
Kono Te wo Nobaseba was used as ending theme for Anime television series MÄR

References 

2008 albums
Being Inc. albums
Japanese-language albums
Giza Studio albums
Garnet Crow albums
Albums produced by Daiko Nagato